Hukam Ram Meghwal (born 23 March 1926 – 2005) was a Member of Parliament from Jalore (Lok Sabha constituency) constituency. He was a member of Janata Party. He died due to heart attack on 12 May 2005.

References

1926 births
2005 deaths
India MPs 1977–1979
Lok Sabha members from Rajasthan
Janata Party politicians
People from Pali district
People from Jalore district